Belle Chrystall (25 April 19107 June 2003) was a British actress who appeared in a number of leading roles in British films during the 1930s. She was born in Preston, Lancashire in 1910. She came to London and after appearing on stage was given a minor part in a film A Warm Corner, directed by Victor Saville but she was given no more work after that. The filming of Hindle Wakes led her to apply for the part of Jenny Hawthorne which led her to become an instant success. She made her last film in 1940.

Filmography
 A Warm Corner (1930)
 Hindle Wakes (1931)
 Hobson's Choice (1931)
 The Frightened Lady (1932)
 Friday the Thirteenth (1933)
 The Girl in the Flat (1934)
 Youthful Folly (1934)
 Key to Harmony (1935)
 The Scotland Yard Mystery (1934)
 The Edge of the World (1937)
 Anything to Declare? (1938)
 Follow Your Star (1938)
 Yellow Sands (1938)
 Poison Pen (1939)
 The House of the Arrow (1940)

References

English film actresses
1910 births
2003 deaths
Actors from Preston, Lancashire
Actresses from Lancashire
20th-century English actresses